During the 1964–65 English football season, Everton F.C. competed in the Football League First Division.

Final league table

Results

Football League First Division

FA Cup

Inter-Cities Fairs Cup

Squad

References

1964–65
Everton F.C. season